Tasmate  (alternatively Oa or Meri) is an Oceanic language spoken in the north of Espiritu Santo Island in Vanuatu.

Name

References

Espiritu Santo languages
Languages of Vanuatu